Avalon is a 1990 American drama film written and directed by Barry Levinson and starring Armin Mueller-Stahl, Aidan Quinn, Elizabeth Perkins, Joan Plowright, and Elijah Wood. It is the third in Levinson's semi-autobiographical tetralogy of "Baltimore films" set in his hometown during the 1940s, 1950s, and 1960s: Diner (1982), Tin Men (1987), and Liberty Heights (1999). The film explores the themes of Jewish assimilation into American life, through several generations of a Polish immigrant family from the 1910s through the 1950s.

The film was released to critical acclaim, and was nominated for four Academy Awards and three Golden Globe Awards.

Plot
It is the late 1940s and early 1950s, and much has happened to the family of Polish Jewish immigrant Sam Krichinsky since he first arrived in America in 1914 and eventually settled in Baltimore.

Television is new. Neighborhoods are changing, with more and more families moving to the suburbs. Wallpaper has been Sam's profession, but his son Jules wants to try his hand at opening a large discount-appliance store with his cousin, Izzy, maybe even do their own commercials on TV.

Jules and his wife, Ann, still live with his parents, but Ann is quietly enduring the way that her opinionated mother-in-law Eva dominates the household. Ann is a modern woman who even learns to drive a car, although Eva refuses to ride with her and takes a streetcar instead.

The family contributes to a fund to bring more relatives to America. Slights, real or imagined, concern the family, as when Jules and Ann finally move to the suburbs, a long way for their relatives to travel. After arriving late and finding a Thanksgiving turkey has been carved without him, Uncle Gabriel is offended and storms out, beginning a feud with Sam.

Sam also cannot understand the methods his grandson Michael's teachers use in school, or why Jules and Izzy have changed their surnames to Kaye and Kirk as they launch their business careers. But when various crises develop, including an armed holdup and a devastating fire, the family gets through the problems together.

Cast

 Armin Mueller-Stahl as Sam Krichinsky
 Michael Krauss as young Sam
 Aidan Quinn as Jules Kaye
 Kevin Blum as young Jules
 Elizabeth Perkins as Ann Kaye
 Joan Plowright as Eva Krichinsky
 Dawne Hindle as young Eva
 Leo Fuchs as Hymie Krichinsky
 Bernard Hiller as young Bernard
 Lou Jacobi as Gabriel Krichinsky
 Michael Edelstein as young Gabriel
 Eve Gordon as Dottie Kirk
 Kevin Pollak as Izzy Kirk
 Israel Rubinek as Nathan Krichinsky
 Brian Shait as young Nathan
 Elijah Wood as Michael Kaye
 Tom Wood as Michael Kaye as adult
 Grant Gelt as Teddy Kirk
 Mindy Loren Isenstein as Mindy Kirk
 Curtis Carnathan as Alexander Kaye
 Shifra Lerer as Nellie Krichinsky
 Christine Mosere	as young Nellie
 Mina Bern as Alice Krichinsky
 Anna Bergman as young Alice
 Frania Rubinek as Faye Krichinsky
 Mary Lechter as young Faye
 Ronald Guttman as Simka
 Herb Levinson as Rabbi Krauss

Relationship with other "Baltimore films"
Levinson frequently places links between his films that are set in Baltimore. For example, there is an image of a diner under construction. A Hudson automobile purchased in Avalon was used in Diner. The house that the Krichinsky family leaves to move to the suburbs was used as a residence in Tin Men.

Reception
Avalon holds a rating of 86% on Rotten Tomatoes from 28 reviews, with an average rating of 7.3/10.

Accolades

Soundtrack
 Avalon (soundtrack)

Home Media
Avalon was released on DVD in 2001.

References

External links
 
 
 
 JUF : Tweens : Movies : Avalon

1990 films
1990 drama films
1990s English-language films
American drama films
Columbia Pictures films
Films about families
Films about immigration to the United States
Films about Jews and Judaism
Films directed by Barry Levinson
Films scored by Randy Newman
Films set in Baltimore
Films set in the 1940s
Films set in the 1950s
Films shot in Baltimore
Independence Day (United States) films
Jews and Judaism in Baltimore
Polish-American culture in Baltimore
Thanksgiving in films
TriStar Pictures films
Yiddish culture in Maryland
1990s American films